The Raid on Mazatlán Railway was an raid launched by supporters of General Francisco I. Madero against the Mazatlán Railway held by supporters of Porfirio Díaz, under the command of the American soldier of fortune, Emil Lewis Holmdahl.

Mazatlán Railway and Raid

In 1909 and 1910, General Francisco I. Madero was in the processing of rebelling against the president of Mexico, Porfirio Díaz and many smaller rebel groups began attacking and raiding settlements under of control of Díaz loyalist. Groups of rebels began launching hit and run style attacks on a key railroad, near the town of Mazatlán in Sinaloa. The goldshipments in particular caused great concern for the leadership of Mazatlán, whose bureaucrats were losing out on income and profits. In response to these attacks the railroad decided to hire an American soldier of fortune named E.L Holmdahl.

Holmdahl had fought in both the Spanish–American War and Philippine–American War, as well as during the Boxer Rebellion and Moro Rebellion, and would be promoted to Sergeant. Upon his discharge from the Army, Holmdahl became a soldier of fortune and mercenary fighting under the likes of "General" Lee Christmas and others in Central and South America. Holmdahl would then become a spy and soldier during the Mexican Revolution.

Due to Holmdahl's experiece it was he who was put in charge of protecting the gold shipments. Holmdahl recruited a decently sized force of 200 men to guard the shipments. Holmdahl trained his men rigorously to fight the "bandits" and had his men would patrol alongside the railway and escort the shipments as they processed. The rebels attempted numerous to attack the shipments, but each time Holmdahl's men repelled them, and Holmdahl would never let an enemy live and soon there were scores of dead men rotting in the sun. The rebels instead of continuously attempting to raid instead the shipments went around Holmdahl's position and raided his camp, stealing 100 horses from the unsuspecting guards, before fleeing into the desert.

Pursuit and Capture

Holmdahl soon received news of the raid and quickly gathered a large posse, numbering most of his strength at around 100-200 men and organized a pusuit. Holmdahl was easily able to track the horse thieves and was able to surround the herd and intercept it's wranglers, and the rebels surrendered immediately. Holmdahl quickly realized these men were not the typical "bandits", but rather peasants due to their appearance and Holmdahl demanded of the peasants "Why did you fools "steal my horses and why should I not hang you?". The peasants began explaining how they served General Madero, who was attempting to liberate them from the cruel crutches of Díaz, and needed the horses not for themselves for the people.

Holmdahl, a deep Maderist sympathizer not only listed to their tale and story, but to the great surprise of both the rebels and his men, who were already tying hangman's knots stated "Not only will I pardon you, I will join you". Holmdahl resigned his job at the railway, took his pay in horses and took command of the small band of peasants, and was now openly a revolutionary.

Aftermath

Holmdahl recruited even more men to his motley band of peasants and began to march against the Díaz forces and began to attack a number of West Coast Village's under the control of Díaz loyalist.

References

Sources

Meed, Douglas (2003). Soldier of Fortune: Adventuring in Latin America and Mexico with Emil Lewis Holmdahl. Houston, Texas: Halycon Press Ltd
Taylor, Laurence D (1999) "The Magonista Revolt in Baja California". The Journal of San Diego History.
History of Mazatlán, Sinaloa (2023)
Fred Wilbur Powell (1921), the Railroads of Mexico

Mexican Revolution
1910 in Mexico
October 1910 events
Battles of the Mexican Revolution